Charles Naylor was a Church of England clergyman who served as Dean of Winchester from 1729 to 1739.

References

Deans of Winchester